The Journal of Global Information Management is a quarterly peer-reviewed academic journal covering information management. It was established in 1993 and is published by IGI Global. The editor-in-chief is Justin Zhang (University of North Florida).

Abstracting and indexing
The journal is abstracted and indexed in:

According to the Journal Citation Reports, the journal has a 2021 impact factor of 3.474.

References

External links

Publications established in 1993
English-language journals
Quarterly journals
Global Information Management, Journal of
Computer science journals
Information management